Fernando Felipe Sánchez Campos (born January 13, 1974) is a Costa Rican politician.

Biography

Early life and education
Fernando Sánchez Campos was born in San José, Costa Rica on January 13, 1974. Married to María del Milagro Linares-Martín, together they have two children: Fernando Felipe and María Pía.  The Sánchez-Linares family are active members of Nuestra Señora de Los Ángeles Parrish in Heredia, Costa Rica.

In terms of academic experience, he has served as rector, professor, tutor, researcher, guest speaker, and consultant at several academic institutions such as the University of Costa Rica and INCAE Business School, as well as at the University of Oxford, the University of Salamanca, and the Catholic University of Valencia.  In addition, he has worked as a consultant for the Inter-American Institute of Human Rights (IIHR), specifically at the Centro de Asesoría y Promoción Electoral (CAPEL).  Nowadays he serves as Rector of the Catholic University of Costa Rica (UCAT), the official university of the Costa Rican Episcopal Conference (CECOR).  Likewise, he is currently the Second Vice President of the Organización de Universidades Católicas de América Latina y el Caribe (ODUCAL), Mexico, Central America, and the Caribbean sub Region and—just recently— a member of the Board of Directors of the International Federation of Catholic Universities (IFCU).

Mr. Sánchez holds a Ph.D. in Politics from the University of Oxford (UK), a master's degree in Business Administration from INCAE Business School (Costa Rica), and a BA in Political Science from the University of Costa Rica.  He has published eight books and has another one in the press, and has also written several chapters in different books and various academic articles.  Likewise, he is a regular contributor to different newspapers of national scope in Costa Rica and has been awarded several prizes, distinctions, and honors (in Costa Rica and abroad).  Fernando Sánchez is a Spanish native speaker and also has fluent knowledge of English and Italian

Political career

Sanchez Campos served as congressman, i.e. member of the Legislative Assembly of Costa Rica, the unicameral parliament of Costa Rica during the period 2006–2010. He was appointed ambassador to the Vatican and to the Food and Agriculture Organization (FAO)on August 24, 2010 http://www.nacion.com/2010-08-24/Deportes/UltimaHora/Deportes2496352.aspx.

Fernando Felipe Sánchez Campos has worked in the public sector as a diplomat, representing the Republic of Costa Rica as Ambassador to the Holy See (The Vatican), to the Sovereign Order of Malta, and as Permanent Representative to the United Nations Rome-based agencies (Food and Agricultural Organization—FAO—, International Fund for Agricultural Development—IFAD—, and the World Food Program—WFP—).  Moreover, he was elected by popular vote as a Deputy to the Legislative Assembly, where he served as president to several central legislative commissions such as: the Permanent Commission for Social Welfare Affairs and the Special Permanent Commission on Foreign Affairs and International Trade.

Involvement in the memorandum on CAFTA-DR referendum 

In 2007, Mr. Sanchez, by then a member of the Costa Rican parliament, was implicated in a scandal concerning a memorandum that he and Kevin Casas, by then vice-president of Costa Rica and minister of national planning, sent to Oscar Arias, president of Costa Rica at the time. The memorandum discussed the strategy to be followed by the government and the ruling party, Liberacion Nacional, on the referendum that took place in October 2007 on CAFTA-DR.

The memo leaked to the press, creating controversy, particularly among the people who opposed CAFTA-DR. According to detractors, the memo suggested questionable and potentially illegal tactics in the government's campaign for the Central American Free-Trade Agreement with the United States. As a consequence of the controversy, Casas announced his resignation from his posts as vice-president and Planning Minister. Sanchez Campos resigned as a member of two parliamentary committees that he chaired at the moment the controversy erupted– the Electoral Reform Commission and the Commission on the Development Bank Law Controversy memorandum.

Controversy on links with US actor Steven Seagal

In June 2010 Sanchez Campos was implicated in a controversy concerning the visit of US actor Steven Seagal to Costa Rica. According to Sanchez Campos’ account, he introduced Seagal to the top Costa Rican authorities that the actor met. Seagal's meeting with Costa Rican ministers was criticized by Costa Rican media on the grounds of pending legal pursuits against Seagal concerning sexual harassment matters. Seagal met José María Tijerino, then minister of Seguridad (Police) as well as the director of the Organismo de Investigación Judicial (OIJ), Jorge Rojas, and reportedly offered his cooperation to develop a proposal to fight crime in Costa Rica. He also met René Castro, Costa Rican minister of foreign affairs to discuss these issues. Seagal claims that he serves as reserve deputy chief of the Sheriff's Office in Jefferson Parish, Louisiana. In 2009, his work there was made into a TV reality show. Critics contend that Seagal's rank of deputy chief is purely ceremonial, although his show suggests that it includes actual involvement. Critics also contend that Seagal says he attended a police academy in Los Angeles and has a certificate from Peace Officer Standards & Training (POST), an organization that accredits police officers. However, according to media reports, POST officials in California and Louisiana said they had no record of Seagal being certified.

Books

Sanchez Campos is the author and co-author of numerous publications. Among others, he published
Partidos políticos, elecciones y lealtades partidarias en Costa Rica: Erosión y Cambio; Politica y poder; Reflexiones desde mi ventana (2005);  and Fortalecimiento de los partidos políticos en América Latina: Institucionalización, democratización y transparencia.

References

External links
Fernando Sanchez Campos

1974 births
Living people
Alumni of St Antony's College, Oxford
Members of the Legislative Assembly of Costa Rica
People from San José, Costa Rica
National Liberation Party (Costa Rica) politicians
Ambassadors of Costa Rica to the Holy See
Representatives of Costa Rica to the Food and Agriculture Organization